Dennis Velez is a United States Navy rear admiral and surface warfare officer who serves as the commander of Carrier Strike Group 10 since April 6, 2022. He most recently served as the commander of Navy Recruiting Command from April 3, 2020 to March 25, 2022.

Velez graduated from the United States Naval Academy in 1992 with a Bachelor of Science in Aerospace Engineering. He earned a master's degree in Information Technology Management. Also has a Master of Science in Management Information Systems from Touro College.

In February 2023, he was nominated for promotion to rear admiral and assignment as director for plans and policy of the United States Cyber Command.

Military decorations and awards
Among Rear Admiral Velez's military decorations are the following:

References

|-

Living people
Date of birth missing (living people)
Year of birth missing (living people)
People from Adjuntas, Puerto Rico
Puerto Rican United States Navy personnel
United States Naval Academy alumni
United States Navy admirals
Recipients of the Defense Superior Service Medal
Recipients of the Legion of Merit
Recipients of the Meritorious Service Medal (United States)
Touro College alumni